This is a timeline of the 2006 Lebanon War during September.

September 2

September 3

September 4

September 6

September 7

September 9

September 13

September 18

October 22

October 23

October 24

References

2006 Lebanon War
2006 Lebanon War (since September)